W.A. Timber Company was a syndicate of Victorian investors granted a timber concession of 181,500 acres on Geographe Bay in the south west of Western Australia in 1870.

It went on to develop a mill and jetty at Lockeville.

The locomotive ordered for the mill railway was the first steam locomotive to operate in Western Australia, as well as being the first to be built in Australia for the 3 ft 6 in gauge. The railway was more commonly known as the Ballaarat Tramline.

The W.A. Timber Company was liquidated in 1888 and its assets auctioned.

Notes

References

See also 
 Nannup Branch Railway
 Tuart Forest
 Vasse and Wonnerup Floodgates

External links
How Ballarat's 19th-century locomotive innovation became Busselton's historical treasure – ABC News article about the locomotive Ballaarat

Railways
Timber companies of Western Australia
Defunct forest products companies of Australia